Guirao is a surname. Notable people with the surname include:

Carlos Guirao (born 1954), Spanish musician
José Guirao (1959–2022), Spanish cultural manager, art expert and former minister of culture
Miguel Guirao (born 1996), Spanish footballer
Olga Guirao (born 1956), Spanish novelist
Rodrigo Guirao Díaz (born 1980), Argentine actor